Mir Jan Mohammad Khan Jamali (born in Usta) is a Pakistani politician who served as the Speaker of the Balochistan Assembly from 4 June 2013 to 2015. Mir Jan Muhammad Jamali served as the 9th Chief Minister of Balochistan from 13 August 1998 till 12 October 1999 when Army Chief General Pervaiz Mushraf over took the Government. He served two terms as Deputy Chairman of the Senate of Pakistan from March 2006 to March 2012. Jan Mohammad Jamali contested in the 2013 elections from PB25 (now PB14) and won on the seat of PML N, He again contested from PB14 and won on the seat of BAP. He is a well-known personality throughout Balochistan.

He is the son of prominent Baloch leader Mir Noor Mohammad Jamali. Mir Jan Mohammad Jamali is from Jaffarabad, in Pakistan's Balochistan province.

Mir Jan Mohammad Jamali was the Chairman of the Municipal Usta Mohammad from 1983 to 1990. He was a member of the Provisional Council of Balochistan from 1983 to 1985. He was first elected as a member of the Provincial Assembly of Balochistan in 1988, serving until 1993. He was a provisional minister from 1993 to 1993. In 1998, he became the Chief Minister of Balochistan, serving until 1999.
He is currently serving as a Speaker of the Balochistan Assembly, a post he has held since 30 October 2021.

References

External links
Mr. Mir Jan Mohammad Jamali

|-

|-

|-

Speakers of the Provincial Assembly of Balochistan
Chief Ministers of Balochistan, Pakistan
Jan Mohammad Jamali
Living people
Balochistan MPAs 2013–2018
Members of the Senate of Pakistan
People from Jafarabad District
1955 births
Deputy chairmen of the Senate of Pakistan